Otōto (Japanese: Younger Brother) may refer to:
 Otōto (TV drama), a 1990 Japanese television drama
 Otōto (2010 film), a 2010 Japanese film by Yoji Yamada
 Her Brother, a 1960 Japanese film by Kon Ichikawa